Giles Smith (born 1962 in Colchester, Essex) is a British journalist for The Times. In 1998 he was named Sports Columnist of the Year. He attended Colchester Royal Grammar School.

Smith was one of the members of a band called Orphans Of Babylon with Geoff Lawrence who in 1983 produced the cassette Pinch Me - I Think I'm In Kent, which was recorded and Produced by their friend, Dave Hoser at Future Studios in Chelmsford. Additional tracks were recorded at Dave Hoser's house in Wivenhoe (Terry and Jean's Fast Fruit and Vegetable Centre). The tracks were edited (there were over 200 edits) and mastered at Octopus Studio by Dave.

This cassette featured 36 tracks - including "Helluva Break By Ray Reardon", "You Lawn Tennis", "The Babylon Shuffle", "Love Me Love My Rabbit", "Guru Guru Guru", "Icarus Dicarus, I Smell A Nail", "Tree Mouse", "Banana Legs" and "Rock 'N' Roll Orphans". The artwork for the cassette was produced by Lorna Oakley. The album was remastered by Dave Hoser in 2014.

In 1986 Giles joined the Dumb Mermaids for a one-off concert at the Quay Theatre Sudbury.

Smith's career in journalism began when he joined The Daily Telegraph in 1990 after a spell as one half of the 1980s band The Cleaners From Venus with Martin Newell. Since then he has written chiefly for The Times.

He has published three books, Lost In Music, about life and growing up with music, and Midnight In The Garden Of Evel Knievel, and We Need To Talk About Kevin Keegan, both collections of extracts from his sports columns.

He currently writes a motoring column in The Times, and a thrice weekly sport column in The Times. He was a regular contributor to The Word Magazine. He also writes for the Chelsea FC website. He is a columnist for the New Statesman.

Bibliography

Lost In Music 
Midnight In The Garden Of Evel Knievel (2000)
 We Need To Talk About Kevin Keegan (2008)

References

External links
Giles Smith Archive at The Times

1962 births
Living people
British male journalists
People educated at Colchester Royal Grammar School